Humboldt High School is a public, co-educational high school in Humboldt, Iowa. It is a part of Humboldt Community School District, and serves grades nine through twelve.

As the sole high school in its district, it serves Humboldt, Dakota City, Hardy, Renwick, and Rutland.

Academics
Humboldt High School has about a 17:1 student / teacher ratio.  There are about 389 students enrolled in Humboldt High.

Auditorium
R. Wesley Carlson auditorium is in the west portion of the school, and is used for school events such as musicals, plays, and band and chorus concerts. Carlson, for whom the auditorium was named, was a superintendent at Humboldt from 1970-1989 and the auditorium was dedicated in his honor June 19, 1989. There is seating for 450 attendees.

Activities 
Humboldt High School offers many opportunities through athletic and co-curricular activities.

Athletic
The Wildcats compete in the North Central Conference.
Humboldt High offers many athletics a student can be involved in. Some include volleyball, football, girls and boys cross country, girls and boys basketball, wrestling, girls and boys track & field, soccer, girls and boys golf, baseball, and softball .

State Championships
 Humboldt Football was 12-1 in 2006, and won a Class 3A State Championship.
 Boys' Cross Country - 1994 Class 2A State Champions
 Wrestling - 1968 Class A State Champions 
 Boys' Track and Field - 1995 Class 3A State Champions
 Girls' Golf - 3-time State Champions (1985, 1987, 2017)

Co-curricular
Humboldt High also offers many co-curricular activities to their students. Some of these are vocal and instrumental music, musicals, KMO, Quiz Bowl, JETS, Science Bowl, and FFA.

Notable alumni
Bruce Reimers, an offensive lineman for the Cincinnati Bengals and Tampa Bay Buccaneers from 1984–1993.
Frank Gotch, a wrestler who went 154-6 in his wrestling career, winning the world heavyweight championship in 1908.
Frank Gotch (MD), American physician who derived the mathematical expressions Kt/V and standardized Kt/V used internationally to quantify and prescribe dialysis therapy for kidney failure.
Jon Porter, former member of the United States House of Representatives in Nevada.
Kevin Dresser, Head coach of wrestling at Iowa State University.
Tony Ersland. Head coach of wrestling at Purdue University.

Notable faculty
Dick Schultz, baseball and basketball coach at Humboldt High School and later the University of Iowa

See also
List of high schools in Iowa

References

External links
 Staff

Public high schools in Iowa
Educational institutions established in 1967
Schools in Humboldt County, Iowa
1967 establishments in Iowa
Humboldt, Iowa